was a Japanese writer of novels, short stories, poetry and essays, who has been associated with Japanese postwar literature and the Atomic bomb literature genre.

Biography
Inoue was born in 1926 as the son of a pottery manufacturer. While Inoue asserted that he was born in Lüshun, China, other sources name Kurume in Fukuoka Prefecture as the actual place of birth. After his mother had left the family, he and his sister were raised by their grandmother. As a youth, he worked in a steel factory in Amagasaki and a coal mine in Nagasaki, before graduating from the Army Radio Weapon Technology Training Center. In 1946, he joined the Japanese Communist Party (JCP), but after facing criticism for his short story Kakarezaru isshō (lit. "An Unwritten Chapter", 1950) and his critical attitude towards Stalinism, he and the JCP broke ties in 1953.

Inoue's writings deal extensively with social and political issues, such as the living conditions of mining workers, Koreans in Japan and the Burakumin, the Korean War, and the effect of the atomic bomb. His most acknowledged works include Kyokō no kurēn (lit. "Fictitious Crane", 1960) and Chi no mure (lit. "People of the Land", 1963). In the Kenzaburō Ōe edited anthology The Crazy Iris and Other Stories of the Atomic Aftermath, Inoue was attested to "capture the tension of post-war Japan in a unique and distinguished style". In 1970, he established and edited the quarterly literary magazine Henkyō ("Frontier"). In addition, he constituted literary schools for aspiring writers. Translations of his works appeared in English, German, Russian, Czech and Serbian language anthologies, in particular his short story The House of Hands about a group of survivors of the atomic bombing of Nagasaki.

Inoue died of cancer in 1992. His last years living with his illness were documented in Kazuo Hara's film A Dedicated Life (Zenshin shosetsuka), which revealed that many details about his life were his own inventions. In his memory, a museum was established and a monument erected in Sakito (now Sakai), Nagasaki.

His eldest daughter is the novelist and translator Kōya Inoue.

Selected works
 1950: Kakarezaru isshō
 1953: Nagagutsu jima
 1960: The House of Hands (Te no ie)
 1960: Kyokō no kurēn
 1963: Chi no mure
 1963–64: Kōhai no natsu 
 1965: Takoku no shi 1966: Kuroi shinrin 1966: Akai temari 1973: Kokoro yasashiki hangyakusha 1976: Maruyama Ransuiro no yujotachi 1982: AshitaTranslations
 

Film adaptations
 1970: Apart from Life (Chi no mure), directed by Kei Kumai
 1988: Tomorrow (Tomorrow – Ashita''), directed by Kazuo Kuroki

Notes

References

1926 births
1992 deaths
20th-century Japanese novelists
20th-century Japanese male writers
Japanese Marxist writers
Japanese communists